Ilja Leonard Pfeijffer (born 17 January 1968) is a Dutch poet, novelist, polemicist and classical scholar. He was born in Rijswijk, Netherlands, and studied, lived and worked in Leiden, and he moved permanently to Genoa, Italy, in 2008.

Biography 
Ilja Leonard Pfeijffer was born on 17 January 1968 in Rijswijk in the Netherlands.

He made his début in 1998 with a collection entitled Of the Square Man, containing of fifty-odd highly individualistic poems. This debut won him the 1999 C. Buddingh’ poetry prize.

As well as a poet, Pfeijffer was for some time a Greek scholar on the staff of Leiden University. He wrote a dissertation on the poetry of Pindar and published a history of classical literature for the general reader. Regarding his own poetry he has outspoken views, not just in his oft-quoted programmatic opening poem "Farewell Dinner," in which he dismisses the hermetic Hans Faverey and calls for "butter-baked images / and bulimic verse". Pfeijffer's poetic polemics leave no room for doubt as to what kind of poetry he prefers. He feels akin to Lucebert, and he abhors the paper verse of introverted hermetics and meek-hearted dreamers ("stumble, stiff romantic, mumble on"). Poetry should have life, and preferably, in Lucebert’s words, "life in full".

Thus Pfeijffer, the "gleaner of contrivances," quotes not only Pindar and Ezra Pound, Horace and Lucebert, Sophocles, Derek Walcott, Herman Gorter, Hans Faverey, Martinus Nijhoff and Gerard Reve, but comic book characters as well. He not only writes about the political martyr Ken Saro Wiwa, but also about C&A sweaters and Fiat Croma, barcodes, canned beer, butt-tight and garamond ten-point italic. The poet neither lacks humor or self-mockery, nor seriousness for that matter, witness his hotly tender love poems: "and though I sang and gave over my loins / and you failed to scorch my senses / I should be useless white on white."

Awards and honors
 1999: C. Buddingh' Prize (1999) for Of the Square Man
 2002:  (2002) for Rupert
 2003:  (or Seghers Literatuurprijs) (2003) for Rupert
 2005:  over 2004
 2014: Tzumprijs voor de beste literaire zin over 2013
 2014: Libris Prize for La Superba
 2015:  for La Superba
 2015: Jan Campert Prize for Idyllen
 2015: Awater Poëzieprijs for Idyllen
 2015:  for Gelukszoekers and Idyllen ant the colums in  NRC Next.
 2015: VSB Poetry Prize for Idyllen
 2015: Awater Poëzieprijs for Idyllen
 2016: VSB Poetry Prize for Idyllen
 2016: Proza prize from the Royal Academy of Dutch Language and Literature for La Superba
 2017: Toneelschrijfprijs for De advocaat

Works

Poetry 
Van de vierkante man, 1998
Het glimpen van de welkwiek, 2001
Dolores. Elegieën, 2002
In de naam van de hond. De grote gedichten, 2005
De man van vele manieren. Verzamelde gedichten 1998–2008 (collected poems)
Idyllen, 2015
Giro Giro Tondo, een obsessie, 2015

Prose 
De antieken. Een literatuurgeschiedenis (literary history), 2000
Rupert. Een bekentenis (novel), 2002
Het geheim van het vermoorde geneuzel (essays), 2003
Het grote baggerboek (novel), 2004
Het ware leven. Een roman (novel), 2006
De eeuw van mijn dochter (theatre), 2007
Second Life. Verhalen en reportages uit een tweede leven (essay), 2007
Malpensa (theatre), 2008
De filosofie van de heuvel. Op de fiets naar Rome (travel literature, with Gelya Bogyatishcheva), 2009
Harde feiten. Honderd romans (short fiction), 2010
De Griekse mythen (mythological compendium), 2010
La Superba (novel), 2013
Brieven uit Genua (letters), 2016
Grand Hotel Europa (novel), 2018
Monterosso mon amour (novella), 2022

English translations
 Rupert: A Confession, 2009 (translated by Michele Hutchison, Rochester, Open Letter, 2009) 
 La Superba, (translated by Michele Hutchison, Dallas, TX, Deep Vellum Publishing, 2016)

External links

"Ilja Pfeijffer, aka Ilja Pfeiffer, the most important poet from the Netherlands", satirical website
Quite comprehensive bibliography (same website as above)

Articles
 Article on I.L. Pfeijffer at the Koninklijke Bibliotheek (in Dutch)

Online poems (with translations)
"en wat het dan betekent"/"and what it means" 
"Een Corinthische ode"/"A Corinthian ode"

1968 births
21st-century Dutch novelists
Dutch male poets
Living people
Dutch male novelists
People from Rijswijk
21st-century Dutch male writers
C. Buddingh' Prize winners